Guadalupe is a  (village/suburban district) in the municipality of Murcia in the Region of Murcia, Spain.  The main populated area is known as Guadalupe de Maciascoque.

El Escorial Murciano, the complex that contains the Universidad Católica San Antonio de Murcia and the Monasterio de los Jerónimos de San Pedro de la Ñora, an historic Hieronymite monastery, is located here.

References

Murcia
Towns in Spain
Populated places in the Region of Murcia